Blažo Lisičić (born 22 August 1972) is a Montenegrin former handball player.

Club career
Born in Titograd, Lisičić was signed by Proleter Zrenjanin as a teenager. He would become a member of the team that won two Yugoslav Championship titles and reached the European Cup final in the 1990–91 season. Between 1993 and 1996, Lisičić played for Belgrade arch-rivals Crvena zvezda and Partizan.

In 1996, Lisičić moved abroad to Spain and signed with Pozoblanco. He spent one season with the Liga ASOBAL club, but failed to help them avoid relegation. From 1997 to 2002, Lisičić played for three teams in Germany, namely TV Niederwürzbach, HSG Dutenhofen/Münchholzhausen, and GWD Minden.

Later on, Lisičić would also spend some time in Italy (Conversano and Casarano), Qatar (Al Sadd), and Croatia (Zagreb). He lastly played for Lovćen in his native Montenegro, adding two more trophies to his collection, before retiring.

International career
At international level, Lisičić competed for FR Yugoslavia in five major tournaments between 1996 and 2003, winning three bronze medals.

After the split of Serbia and Montenegro, Lisičić represented Montenegro, helping the nation qualify for the 2008 European Championship.

Honours
Proleter Zrenjanin
 Yugoslav Handball Championship: 1989–90, 1991–92
Partizan
 Handball Championship of FR Yugoslavia: 1994–95
Al Sadd
 Qatar Handball League: 2003–04
Zagreb
 Croatian Handball Premier League: 2005–06
 Croatian Handball Cup: 2005–06
Lovćen
 Montenegrin Men's Handball Cup: 2008–09, 2009–10

References

External links
 

1972 births
Living people
Sportspeople from Podgorica
Yugoslav male handball players
Montenegrin male handball players
RK Proleter Zrenjanin players
RK Crvena zvezda players
RK Partizan players
TV Niederwürzbach players
RK Zagreb players
Liga ASOBAL players
Handball-Bundesliga players
Expatriate handball players
Serbia and Montenegro expatriate sportspeople in Spain
Serbia and Montenegro expatriate sportspeople in Germany
Serbia and Montenegro expatriate sportspeople in Italy
Serbia and Montenegro expatriate sportspeople in Qatar
Serbia and Montenegro expatriate sportspeople in Croatia